Damian Węglarz (born 21 March 1996) is a Polish professional footballer who plays as a goalkeeper for Chrobry Głogów, on loan from Wisła Płock.

Career

Jagiellonia Białystok

Węglarz started his career with Zawisza Bydgoszcz.

Węglarz sustained a broken finger during the match with Lechia Gdańsk but continued to play the full 90 minutes as well as play the complete next match against Legia Warsaw. After the Legia match the team physician disallowed Węglarz from playing for the next few weeks.

Wigry Suwałki (loan)
On 18 December 2017, Węglarz was loaned out to Polish second tier side Wigry Suwałki for the rest of the season.

Career statistics

Club

References

External links

1996 births
Living people
Sportspeople from Bydgoszcz
Polish footballers
Poland youth international footballers
Association football goalkeepers
Zawisza Bydgoszcz players
Jagiellonia Białystok players
Wisła Płock players
Wigry Suwałki players
Chrobry Głogów players
Ekstraklasa players
I liga players
II liga players
III liga players